Gregory George Teu (3 February 1951 – 25 January 2021) was a Tanzanian CCM politician and Member of Parliament for Mpwapwa constituency from 2010 to 2015. From 2012 to 2014 he was also Deputy Minister of Industry, Trade and Marketing.

Teu died on 25 January 2021, from COVID-19.

References

1951 births
Living people
Chama Cha Mapinduzi MPs
Tanzanian MPs 2010–2015
Mazengo Secondary School alumni
Mzumbe University alumni
Alumni of Birmingham City University
Deaths from the COVID-19 pandemic in Tanzania